Anna Maria Mackenzie was a prolific author of popular novels active during the late eighteenth and early nineteenth centuries. She was closely associated with the Minerva Press.

Life
Anna Maria Wight was the daughter of a coal merchant in Essex; little more is known of her early life or antecedents. She married a man named Cox who died and left her with four children and financially dependent on relatives. She worked at a women's boarding school as an assistant, then turned to writing full time. Judging by her publishing history, by 1789 she was remarried, to a man named Johnson, and by 1795 she was publishing as Mrs. Mackenzie, presumably the name of a third (and final) husband.

Writing
Anna Maria Mackenzie provides the bibliographer with a challenge, as she published anonymously, as well as under a pseudonym, and also under each of her three married names. This may be why many accounts of her career contain some variation of the phrase that she wrote "at least" sixteen novels: there are sixteen that are reasonably certain but she may have written more. There were also, apparently, newspaper pieces published early on. It was as a novelist, however, that she built her career. Reviewers of her novels "were usually kind to her" and her novels were routinely pirated. She published much of her work for William Lane, founder of the successful Minerva Press and proprietor of the Lane Circulating Library, and her own work was responsive to trends in popular taste. Her first major work, Burton Wood (1783), was a sentimental epistolary novel; many of her works contained Gothic and sensational elements; later she turned to historical fiction with Monmouth (1790); Danish Massacre (1791), set in early medieval times; and Mysteries Elucidated (1795), set in the fourteenth century. As one commentator has it, "her career exemplifies almost every trend of the period."

Works

Novels
 Burton-Wood. In a series of letters. By a lady. London: printed for the author, by H.D. Steel, no. 51, Lothbury, near Coleman street. And sold by W. Flexney, bookseller, Holborn. 1783.
 The gamesters: a novel. In three volumes. By the authoress of Burton-Wood and Joseph. London: printed by H. D. Steel, No. 51, Lothbury, and sold by R. Baldwin, No. 47, Pater-Noster-Row, 1786.
 Retribution: a novel. By the author of the Gamesters, &c. In three volumes. London: printed by G.G.J. and J. Robinson, 1788.
 Calista; A novel. In two volumes. By Mrs. Johnson, author of Retribution, The gamesters, &c. London: printed for W. Lane, Leadenhall-Street, 1789.
 Monmouth: a tale, founded on historic facts. Inscribed to his grace the Duke of Buccleugh. By Anna Maria Johnson, author of Calista, a novel, &c. in three volumes. London: printed for W. Lane, Leadenhall-Street, 1790.
 Danish massacre: an historic fact. By the author of Monmouth, a tale. In two volumes. London: printed for William Lane, at the Minerva Press, Leadenhall-Street, 1791.
 Slavery: or, the times. In two volumes. By the author of Monmouth, The Danish massacre, &c. London: printed for G. G. J. and J. Robinsons; and J. Dennis, 1792.
 Orlando and Lavinia. Or, the Libertine. a Novel. in Four Volumes. by a Lady. printed for L. Wayland, No. 2, Middle-Row, Holborn, 1792.
 Mysteries elucidated, a novel. In three volumes. By the author of Danish massacre, Monmouth, &c. London: printed for William Lane, at the Minerva Press, Leadenhall-Street, 1795.
 The neapolitan; or, the test of integrity. a novel. In three volumes. By Ellen of Exeter. London: printed for William Lane, at the Minerva-Press, Leadenhall-Street, 1796.
 Dusseldorf; or, the fratricide. A romance. In three volumes. By Anna Maria Mackenzie. London: printed at the Minerva-Press, for William Lane, Leadenhall-Street, 1798.
 Feudal events, or, days of yore. An ancient story. In two volumes. By Anna Maria Mackenzie, Author of Neapolitan, Dusseldory, &c. &c. London: printed at the Minerva-Press, for William Lane, Leadenhall-Street, 1800.
 Swedish Mysteries, or Hero of the Mines. A Tale. In three volumes. Translated from a Swedish Manuscript, by Johanson Kidderslaw, formerly master of the English Grammar School at Upsal. London: Printed at the Minerva-Press, for William Lane, Leadenhall-Street, 1801.
 Martin & Mansfeldt, or the Romance of Franconia. In Three Volumes. By Anna Maria Mackenzie, author of Mysteries Elucidated, Feudal Events, &c. London: Printed at the Minerva-Press, for Lane and Newman, Leadenhall-Street, 1802.
 The Irish Guardian, or, Errors of Eccentricity. In Three Volumes. By Mrs. Mackenzie. London: Printed for Longman, Hurst, Rees, and Orme, 39, Paternoster-Row, 1809.
 Almeria D'Aveiro; or, The Irish Guardian. A Novel. In Three Volumes. By Mrs. Mackenzie, author of Mysteries Elucidated; Feudal Events; Martin and Mansfeldt; Dusseldorf; Neapolitan, &c. &c. London: Printed at the Minerva-Press, for A. K. Newman and Co. (Successors to Lane, Newman, & Co.), 1811.

Religious
 Joseph. In five books. By A. M. Cox. London: printed for the author; by H. D. Steel, No. 51, Lothbury, near Coleman-Street, and sold by the following booksellers: Mr. Dodsley, Pall-Mall; Mr. Flexney; Holborn; and Mr. Fielding, Pater-Noster-Row, 1783: a religious text published by subscription under her first married name

Etexts 
 Joseph. 1783: available at Google Books
 Retribution. 1788: available at Google Books: Vol. I, II, III
 Monmouth. 1790: PDF, Chawton House
 Danish massacre. 1791: available at Google Books: Vol. I, II
 Mysteries elucidated. 1795: available at the Internet Archive: Vol. I, II, III.
 Dusseldorf. 1798: available at Google Books: Vol. I, II, III
 Feudal events. 1800: available at Google Books: Vol. I, II
 The Irish Guardian. 1809: PDF, Chawton House

See also
 Circulating library
 List of Minerva Press authors
 Minerva Press
 William Lane

Notes

References
Blain, Virginia, et al., eds. "Mackenzie, Anna Maria (Wight)." The Feminist Companion to Literature in English. New Haven and London: Yale UP, 1990, pp. 694—695. (Open access at the Internet Archive)
 Brown, Susan, et al. "Anna Maria Mackenzie." Orlando: Women’s Writing in the British Isles from the Beginnings to the Present. Ed. Susan Brown, Patricia Clements, and Isobel Grundy. Cambridge University Press. Cambridge UP, n.d. 22 Mar. 2013. Accessed 7 Sept. 2022.
Summers, Montague. A Gothic Bibliography (1941; available online at Internet Archive)
Neiman, Elizabeth, and Christina Morin. "Re-evaluating the Minerva Press: introduction." Romantic textualties: literature and print culture, 1780-1840. Issue 23: Special Issue: The Minerva Press and the literary marketplace (Summer 2020): 15.
Todd, Janet. "Mackenzie, Anna Maria (fl. 1783-1811)." A Dictionary of British and American women writers, 1660-1800. Totowa, N.J.: Rowman & Allanheld, 1985, pp. 205—206. (Open access at the Internet Archive)
Turner, Cheryl. Living by the pen: women writers in the eighteenth century. London; New York: Routledge, 1992. (Open access at Internet Archive)
Mackenzie, Anna Maria." The Women's Print History Project, 2019, Person ID 1081. Accessed 2022-09-07.

External links
Minerva Press, British Fiction 1800–1829 Database

Corvey Women Writers on the Web Author's Page

18th-century British novelists
18th-century English women writers
18th-century British writers
18th-century English people
18th-century English women
18th-century English writers
18th-century pseudonymous writers
19th-century English women writers
19th-century English writers
19th-century pseudonymous writers
English women novelists
Pseudonymous women writers
Writers of the Romantic era
year of birth unknown
year of death unknown